Hump coral may refer to several different species of coral:

 Porites compressa Dana, 1846
 Porites cylindrica Dana, 1846
 Porites furcata Lamarck, 1816 
 Porites porites Pallas, 1766